The Portland Van and Storage Building is a building located in north Portland, Oregon listed on the National Register of Historic Places.

The Portland fire marshal halted construction in 1925 when it was discovered that window space in the building was not equal to one-twenty-fifth of floor space, a violation of the building code. The city council granted a special permit allowing construction to be completed, giving the building its unique appearance.

See also
 National Register of Historic Places listings in North Portland, Oregon

References

External links
 

1926 establishments in Oregon
Chicago school architecture in Oregon
Commercial buildings completed in 1926
National Register of Historic Places in Portland, Oregon
North Portland, Oregon
Eliot, Portland, Oregon
Portland Historic Landmarks